Morne Bauer is an Irish cricketer. He made his Twenty20 cricket debut for Munster Reds in the 2017 Inter-Provincial Trophy on 16 June 2017.

References

External links
 

Year of birth missing (living people)
Living people
Irish cricketers
Munster Reds cricketers
Place of birth missing (living people)